William Kumado (born 2 December 2002) is a Ghanaian footballer who plays as a right-back for Danish Superliga club Lyngby Boldklub.

Club career

FC Nordsjælland
Nagalo was born in Ghana and was a part of the Right to Dream Academy, before joining FC Nordsjælland at the end of February 2021. Nagalo made 13 appearances for the clubs U-19 team in the remaining of the season.

On 17 October 2021, Kumado got his professional debut for Nordsjælland in the Danish Superliga against FC Midtjylland. Kumado started on the bench, before replacing Oliver Villadsen in the 69th minute. Kumado did also play in the following league game against Vejle Boldklub on 22 October.

On 13 October 2022, Nordsjælland confirmed that Kumado had been promoted to the first team squad.

Lyngby
On 31 January, 2023, Kumado left Nordsjælland, signing up for a 2½ year contract with local rivals Lyngby Boldklub. He got his debut for Lyngby on 19 February 2023 against his former club, FC Nordsjælland.

References

External links
 

2002 births
Living people
Ghanaian footballers
Ghanaian expatriate footballers
Right to Dream Academy players
FC Nordsjælland players
Lyngby Boldklub players
Danish Superliga players
Association football defenders
Ghanaian expatriate sportspeople in Denmark
Expatriate men's footballers in Denmark